Pat Yankee (July 20, 1927 – May 30, 2022) was an American jazz and blues singer.

Yankee was born in Lodi, California and had a long career as a performing musician. She was also in the 1946 film It's Great to Be Young as Anita. She performed in an off-Broadway musical Basin Street in 1983 (in the New Federal Theatre).

Yankee died on May 30, 2022.

Discography
 Pat Yankee Salutes Louis Armstrong (GHB, 1998)
 Pat Yankee Sings Saloon Songs (GHB, 2000)
 Salute to Saloon Tunes Vol. 2 (GHB, 2003)
 Together at Last (GHB, 2004)
 Remembering Sophie Tucker (GHB, 2005)

With Turk Murphy
 Music for Wise Guys & Boosters, Card Sharps & Crap Shooters (Roulette, 1959)
 At the Roundtable (Roulette, 1959)
 Let the Good Times Roll (RCA Victor, 1962)

Filmography
 Anita in It's Great to Be Young 1946

References

External links
 P Clute, C Clute, J Goggin, B Helm. Meet Me at Mcgoon's - Google Books

1927 births
2022 deaths
American women jazz singers
American jazz singers
21st-century American women
People from Lodi, California